The Capt. James Moore Homestead is an archaeological site in rural Tazewell County, Virginia.  The site is located near Boissevain, and has both colonial and Native American significance.  There was once a palisaded Native village from the Late Woodland period on the site, and it was chosen by James Moore, a local militia captain who was one of Tazewell County's early settlers, as the site of his homestead in 1772.  Sixteen years later (1786) he was killed by a Shawnee party that also took his family prisoner.

The site was listed on the National Register of Historic Places in 2002.

See also
National Register of Historic Places listings in Tazewell County, Virginia

References

External Links 
 Captain James Moore Homestead at the Tazewell County Historical Society

Archaeological sites on the National Register of Historic Places in Virginia
National Register of Historic Places in Tazewell County, Virginia
Residential buildings completed in 1772